Bhranti Bilas is a 1963 Bengali-language comedy film based on the 1869 play of the same name by Ishwar Chandra Vidyasagar, which is itself based on William Shakespeare's The Comedy of Errors. The film was produced by Uttam Kumar and he played double roles. Others in the film are Bhanu Banerjee who also played dual roles, Sabitri Chatterjee and Sandhya Roy. The film was made under the banner of Uttam Kumar Films Pvt Ltd. The music of the film composed by Shyamal Mitra. The film was remade in Bollywood thrice as Do Dooni Char, Angoor and Cirkus.

The classic comedy was made based on Ishwarchandra Vidyasagar's popular novel with a similar name, which itself was inspired by the Shakespearian play 'Comedy Of Errors'. In this movie, Uttam Kumar and Bhanu Bandyopadhyay were cast as a merchant and his servant, respectively. They visit a new town but don't know about the existence of their respective twin brothers and it ultimately leads to a series of confusions leading to a laugh riot.

Plot
Although the original play was set in an unspecified, but distant past, the film relocates the story to modern day India. The film tells the story of a Bengali merchant from Kolkata and his servant who visit a small town for a business appointment, but, whilst there, are mistaken for a pair of locals, leading to much confusion.

Cast
 Uttam Kumar as Chiranjib Chowdhury and Chiranjit Chowdhury
 Bhanu Bandopadhyay as Bhakti Kinkar and Shakti Kinkar
 Sabitri Chatterjee as Chiranjib's Wife
 Sandhya Roy as Bilashini, Chiranjib's sister-in-law
 Sabita Bose as Aparajita
 Tarun Kumar as Money lender
 Chhaya Devi as Chiranjit & Chiranjib's Mother
 Bidhayak Bhattacharya as Bosupriyo

Soundtrack

Production
The story was written by Ishwar Chandra Vidyasagar which he adapted from The Comedy Of Errors written by William Shakespeare.

This was the third film produced by Uttam Kumar after the blockbuster iconic Harano Sur and Saptapadi which he produced along with Ajoy Kar. But this time he separated from Ajoy Kar and made his only own production and named Uttam Kumar Films Private Limited. In the film Uttam Kumar played dual role and this is the third film after Tasher Ghar in 1957 and iconic Jhinder Bandi in 1961 where Uttam playing in double role. Bhanu Bandopadhyay also played a dual role in the film.

Remakes
The film is remade in several times. At first it's remade in 1968 Hindi film as Do Dooni Char directed by Debu Sen starring Kishore Kumar, Asit Sen and Tanuja. A 1982 Hindi remake directed by the legendary Gulzar as Angoor starring Sanjeev Kumar, Moushumi Chatterjee.

References

External links
 

1963 films
Bengali-language Indian films
Indian comedy films
Indian films based on plays
Modern adaptations of works by William Shakespeare
Films based on The Comedy of Errors
Films based on adaptations
Bengali films remade in other languages
1960s Bengali-language films